Valery Knyazev (born June 11, 1992) is a Russian ice hockey player. He currently plays with HC Sibir Novosibirsk of the Kontinental Hockey League (KHL).

Knyazev was selected by Sibir Novosibirsk in the first round (15th overall) of the 2011 KHL Junior Draft, and he made his KHL debut with HC Sibir during the 2011–12 KHL season.

References

External links

1992 births
Living people
HC Sibir Novosibirsk players
Zauralie Kurgan players
Sibirskie Snaipery players
Ice hockey people from Prague
Russian ice hockey right wingers